Orthetrum macrostigma is a species of dragonfly in the family Libellulidae. It is found in the Democratic Republic of the Congo, Mozambique, and possibly Zambia. Its natural habitats are swamps, freshwater marshes, and intermittent freshwater marshes.

References

Libellulidae
Taxonomy articles created by Polbot
Insects described in 1947